The Hollywood Hotel was a hostelry and landmark of Hollywood, California.

Hollywood Hotel may also refer to:
 Hollywood Hotel (radio program), a 1930s radio program starring Louella Parsons
 Hollywood Hotel (film), a 1937 film starring Dick Powell
 Disney's Hollywood Hotel, at the Hong Kong Disneyland Resort
 Hollywood Hotel, a broadcast studio for Fox NASCAR

 Hotel Hollywood (2010), a thriller film
 Hotel Hollywood, an Australian building in the Inter-War Functionalist style